NGC 635 is a spiral galaxy located in the constellation of Cetus about 626 million light years from the Milky Way. NGC 635 was discovered by the American astronomer Francis Leavenworth in 1885. It is also known as MCG-04-05-002 or PGC 6062, although in SIMBAD its New General Catalogue designation is not recognized.

See also 
 List of NGC objects (1–1000)

References 

Spiral galaxies
Cetus (constellation)
0635
006062